Takayuki Okochi   (born August 15, 1974) is a Japanese mixed martial artist. He competed in the Lightweight division.

Mixed martial arts record

|-
| Loss
| align=center| 7-14-3
| Vladimir Zenin
| Decision (unanimous)
| Bushido FC: Legends
| 
| align=center| 2
| align=center| 5:00
| Saint Petersburg, Russia
| 
|-
| Loss
| align=center| 7-13-3
| Michiyuki Ishibashi
| KO (punch)
| Shooto: Shooto Tradition 6
| 
| align=center| 1
| align=center| 0:13
| Tokyo, Japan
| 
|-
| Loss
| align=center| 7-12-3
| Yuri Folomkin
| Submission
| Union of Veterans of Sport: Championship Cup 2007
| 
| align=center| 2
| align=center| N/A
| Russia
| 
|-
| Loss
| align=center| 7-11-3
| Paolo Milano
| Submission (guillotine choke)
| Shooto: Battle Mix Tokyo 4
| 
| align=center| 1
| align=center| 0:16
| Tokyo, Japan
| 
|-
| Loss
| align=center| 7-10-3
| Anton Kuivanen
| TKO
| Shooto Estonia: Bushido
| 
| align=center| 1
| align=center| 0:59
| Tallinn, Estonia
| 
|-
| Loss
| align=center| 7-9-3
| Erikas Petraitis
| Decision (unanimous)
| K-1 HERO'S: HERO's Lithuania 2005
| 
| align=center| 2
| align=center| 5:00
| Vilnius, Lithuania
| 
|-
| Loss
| align=center| 7-8-3
| Tomonari Kanomata
| Decision (unanimous)
| Shooto 2004: 5/3 in Korakuen Hall
| 
| align=center| 2
| align=center| 5:00
| Tokyo, Japan
| 
|-
| Loss
| align=center| 7-7-3
| Mitsuhiro Ishida
| Decision (unanimous)
| Shooto 2004: 1/24 in Korakuen Hall
| 
| align=center| 2
| align=center| 5:00
| Tokyo, Japan
| 
|-
| Draw
| align=center| 7-6-3
| Darius Skliaudys
| Draw
| Shooto Lithuania: King of Bushido Stage 1
| 
| align=center| 2
| align=center| 5:00
| Vilnius, Lithuania
| 
|-
| Draw
| align=center| 7-6-2
| Takafumi Hanai
| Draw
| Zst: The Battlefield 3
| 
| align=center| 3
| align=center| 3:00
| Tokyo, Japan
| 
|-
| Loss
| align=center| 7-6-1
| Daisuke Sugie
| Decision (unanimous)
| Shooto: Gig Central 3
| 
| align=center| 2
| align=center| 5:00
| Nagoya, Aichi, Japan
| 
|-
| Win
| align=center| 7-5-1
| Mindaugas Smirnovas
| Submission (triangle choke)
| Rings Lithuania: Bushido Rings 5: Shock
| 
| align=center| 1
| align=center| 3:22
| Vilnius, Lithuania
| 
|-
| Win
| align=center| 6-5-1
| Masato Fujiwara
| TKO (punches)
| Shooto: Gig East 11
| 
| align=center| 2
| align=center| 4:24
| Tokyo, Japan
| 
|-
| Win
| align=center| 5-5-1
| Hiroki Kotani
| KO (knee)
| Shooto: Treasure Hunt 9
| 
| align=center| 1
| align=center| 2:06
| Setagaya, Tokyo, Japan
| 
|-
| Loss
| align=center| 4-5-1
| Naoki Matsushita
| Decision (majority)
| Shooto: Gig Central 1
| 
| align=center| 2
| align=center| 5:00
| Nagoya, Aichi, Japan
| 
|-
| Win
| align=center| 4-4-1
| Mitsuo Matsumoto
| Decision (unanimous)
| Shooto: Treasure Hunt 2
| 
| align=center| 2
| align=center| 5:00
| Setagaya, Tokyo, Japan
| 
|-
| Loss
| align=center| 3-4-1
| Kuniyoshi Hironaka
| Decision (unanimous)
| Shooto: Gig East 6
| 
| align=center| 2
| align=center| 5:00
| Tokyo, Japan
| 
|-
| Win
| align=center| 3-3-1
| Tomonori Ohara
| Decision (unanimous)
| Shooto: Gig East 2
| 
| align=center| 2
| align=center| 5:00
| Tokyo, Japan
| 
|-
| Loss
| align=center| 2-3-1
| Seichi Ikemoto
| KO (knees)
| Shooto: Gig West 1
| 
| align=center| 1
| align=center| 4:01
| Osaka, Japan
| 
|-
| Win
| align=center| 2-2-1
| Matthias Riccio
| Decision (majority)
| Shooto: R.E.A.D. 12
| 
| align=center| 2
| align=center| 5:00
| Tokyo, Japan
| 
|-
| Loss
| align=center| 1-2-1
| Shigetoshi Iwase
| Decision (majority)
| Shooto: R.E.A.D. 4
| 
| align=center| 2
| align=center| 5:00
| Setagaya, Tokyo, Japan
| 
|-
| Loss
| align=center| 1-1-1
| Saburo Kawakatsu
| Decision (unanimous)
| Shooto: Shooter's Passion
| 
| align=center| 2
| align=center| 5:00
| Setagaya, Tokyo, Japan
| 
|-
| Draw
| align=center| 1-0-1
| Norio Fujita
| Draw
| Shooto: Shooter's Soul
| 
| align=center| 2
| align=center| 5:00
| Setagaya, Tokyo, Japan
| 
|-
| Win
| align=center| 1-0
| Hiromichi Maruyama
| Decision (majority)
| Shooto: Shooter's Dream
| 
| align=center| 2
| align=center| 5:00
| Setagaya, Tokyo, Japan
|

See also
List of male mixed martial artists

References

External links
 

1974 births
Japanese male mixed martial artists
Lightweight mixed martial artists
Living people